FSArchiver is a disk cloning utility for Linux. FSArchiver can save partitions containing different popular file systems to a disk image. It is a continuation of PartImage, which was a project from one of the same authors, and implements new features that PartImage lacks. 

FSArchiver strives to be more feature-rich and less UX than PartImage. As a result, it is used by other software and toolsets for its functionality. Two of the most widely used features that PartImage lacks are support for multi-core compression and support for the commonly used Ext4 filesystem.

Features 
For Windows users, FSArchiver includes experimental support for NTFS. FSArchiver supports most modern Linux file systems such as ext4, reiser4 and btrfs.

Other notable features include modern and multi-threaded compression of disk image files, combined with file-based images (as opposed to block-based images most similar tools use) to enhance compression by ignoring unused clusters.

An essential key feature of FSArchiver is "Everything is checksummed in the archive in order to protect the data. If the archive is corrupt, you just lose the current file, not the whole archive."

See also 

 List of disk cloning software

References

External links
 

Disk images
Free backup software
Disk cloning
Free system software